London Regional Transport (LRT) was the organisation responsible for most of the public transport network in London, England, between 1984 and 2000. In common with all London transport authorities from 1933 to 2000, the public name and operational brand of the organisation was London Transport from 1989, but until then it traded as LRT. This policy was reversed after the appointment of Sir Wilfred Newton in 1989, who also abolished the recently devised LRT logo and restored the traditional roundel.

History
The LRT was created by the London Regional Transport Act 1984 and was under direct state control, reporting to the Secretary of State for Transport. It took over responsibility from the Greater London Council on 29 June 1984, two years before the GLC was formally abolished. Because the Act only received the Royal assent three days earlier, its assets were temporarily frozen by the banks as they had not received mandates to transfer. The headquarters of the new organisation remained at the former London Transport Executive building at 55 Broadway.

On 1 April 1985, the company was re-organised into several companies with London Regional Transport as the holding company. London Buses Limited was formed to manage the bus network and London Underground Limited the London Underground network, as wholly owned subsidiaries of LRT.

In 1985 the operation of some bus services was put out to tender for the first time and, for a number of years, buses bearing a variety of different colour-schemes operated alongside those still operating in the traditional red livery by operators such as Armchair Passenger Transport, Boro'line Maidstone, Capital Citybus, Grey-Green, Harris Bus, Kentish Bus, London Buslines and Metrobus.  In response to the competition, LRT established low-cost business units Bexleybus and Westlink. The variety of liveries was found to be confusing to tourists and non-Londoners expecting to find red-painted buses and, after lobbying from the tourist board, in 1997 it became a requirement when contracts were retendered that bus liveries be predominantly red.

In 1987, the computer services division was sold to Cap Gemini for £1.3 million. On 1 April 1989 London Buses was divided into business units, in preparation for privatisation.

Upon the privatisation of British Rail, the Waterloo & City line passed to the London Underground and LRT management on 1 April 1994. In 1994/95, the bus units were sold. LRT remained in control of public transport in London until 2 July 2000 when Transport for London, an agency of the newly created Greater London Authority took over responsibility under the Greater London Authority Act 1999.

Fares
LRT was responsible for some modifications to the fare system, including inclusion of the separately managed British Rail services. In January 1985 the Capitalcard season ticket was launched, offering validity on British Rail as well as London Underground and London Buses. It was priced around 10-15% higher than the Travelcard. In June 1986 the One Day Capitalcard was launched. The Capitalcard brand ended in January 1989 when the Travelcard gained validity on British Rail. In January 1991 Zone 5 was split to create a new Zone 6. The Docklands Light Railway was opened on 31 August 1987 and was included in the zonal Travelcard ticketing scheme.

Chairmen 

 Sir Keith Bright, 1984–1988
 Sir Neil Shields, 1988–1989
 Sir Wilfrid Newton, 1989–1994
Peter Ford, 1994-1998
 Sir Malcolm Bates, 1999–2001
 Bob Kiley, 2001
 Sir Malcolm Bates, 2001–2003

Publication
LT News was London Regional Transport's inhouse journal. First published in April 1973, it was originally published fortnightly, becoming monthly in January 1988. It was renamed LRT News in July 1984, before resuming its original title in September 1990.

References

External links

London Transport (Archive)

Defunct transport authorities in London
Greater London Council replacement organisations
Intermodal transport authorities in the United Kingdom
Organizations established in 1984
Organizations disestablished in 1984
1980s in London
1984 establishments in England
1990s in London
2000 disestablishments in England